Story Kathe is a 2013 Indian Kannada-language psychological thriller film written and directed by Jagadish K. R. It stars Prathap Narayan and Thilak Shekar.

Filming began in 2012 and went through several revisions. It finally opened in 2013 to positive reviews, but earned less than expected at the box office.

Cast 
 Prathap Narayan as Veera
 Thilak Shekar as Rajiv
 Parvathy Nair as Pallavi
 Neha Patel
 Aaryan Achukatla

Soundtrack

Vasu Dixit and Sathish Babu composed the film's background score and music for its soundtrack, with its lyrics written by Santhosh Nayak. The soundtrack album consists six tracks.

Release

Critical reception 
A critic from The Times of India wrote that "Director K R Jagadish has given a different kind of a movie for the Sandalwood. There is freshness in the script and narration as the director has tried to tell two different stories on parallel tracks".

Awards
3rd South Indian International Movie Awards
 SIIMA Award for Best Female Debutant – Parvathy Nair

References

External links
 

2013 films
2010s Kannada-language films
Indian independent films